Covington Latin School is a co-educational Catholic college-preparatory high school in Covington, Kentucky, USA, offering a classical education. Since its inception in 1923, the school has operated under the Diocese of Covington; it is located next to the Cathedral Basilica of the Assumption.

History
Covington Latin School was founded in 1923 as a boys' school by Bishop Francis Howard and modeled on the German Gymnasium. It opened in a private house with 15 students. In 1925 it moved to Mother of God School and in November 1926 to the Knights of Columbus hall, an 1877 building that had originally been a Methodist Episcopal and was renovated to house the school. The official dedication of that building took place in March 1927. In 1941 the school replaced it with a three-story purpose-built building on the same site, designed in Gothic style to harmonize with the cathedral. That year there were 170 students.

An expansion of the building that more than doubled its instructional space and included new science classroom and laboratory space, a technology center, a multi-purpose room that can serve as a theatre, and elevator access to both old and new sections was opened on December 7, 2011, the anniversary of the 1941 opening.

Beginning in the late 1930s, the school offered a college-level program called St. Thomas More College in association with Villa Madonna College, a Catholic women's college; this ended in 1945 when Villa Madonna became coeducational (in 1964 it became Thomas More College). Merger discussions with Villa Madonna Academy, a Catholic girls' school, were suggested by the diocese but were unfruitful; instead in 1992–93 Covington Latin School became coeducational on its own (as later did Villa Madonna).

Since 2013, the school has had a system of 14 houses.

Extracurriculars
Covington Latin School is a member of the Kentucky High School Athletic Association and offers athletic teams in:

Archery
Baseball
Basketball
Bowling
Cheerleading
Cross Country
Diving
Golf
Soccer 
Softball
Swimming
Tennis
Track and Field
Volleyball

Varsity, Junior Varsity, and Freshman teams are offered but vary annually, co-educationally and between sports.

Notable alumni

David Justice 1982, MLB player
Christian McDaniel 1993, Kentucky State Senator
Timothy Lee Nolan former judge

References

External links
School website
2011 Covington Latin School's dedication of new building at WCPO-TV

Roman Catholic Diocese of Covington
Catholic secondary schools in Kentucky
Schools in Kenton County, Kentucky
Buildings and structures in Covington, Kentucky
Educational institutions established in 1923
1923 establishments in Kentucky